Mass media in Jersey consist of several different types of communications media: television, radio, newspapers, magazines, and Internet-based Web sites.

Broadcasting
The Frémont Point transmitting station is a facility for FM and television transmission at Frémont in Saint John, Jersey.

Television
Local terrestrial television in Jersey is provided by ITV Channel Television (part of the ITV network) and BBC Channel Islands (an opt-out service from BBC South West), both of these have local broadcast studios, production teams, presenters and other staff. Many other off-island stations are available, which are mostly the same as those available in United Kingdom.

ITV Channel Television – the longer-serving of the two services – produces regional programming for the Islands, including a flagship nightly news programme, ITV News Channel TV, which is supplemented by shorter news bulletins seven days a week. Other programmes previously shown include a twice-weekly sports magazine show Report Sport, the long-running children's series Puffin's Pla(i)ce and local documentaries.

BBC Channel Islands News is an opt-out service for the Channel Islands, broadcast from the BBC Radio Jersey studios in St Helier at 6:30 pm (during the first half of Spotlight) and at 10:25 pm (after the BBC News at Ten) each weeknight on BBC One.

Jersey is depicted in the detective programme Bergerac.

Radio
Local radio in Jersey is broadcast on FM by BBC Radio Jersey, and Channel 103. Both also on Channel Island DAB mux since 1 August 2021

Bailiwick Radio broadcasts two music services, Classics and Hits, 24 hours a day online. It is also available on DAB+ Channel Island mux. and through Apple and Android apps and on TuneIn.

Radio Youth FM, an internet radio station run by young people aged 12 – 24 is also active in the island and broadcasts up to 10 shows each week.

Jersey used to be served by the Normandy-based radio station Contact 94.

Print

Newspapers
The Jersey Evening Post, is the main printed source of local news and official notices. Its daily average net circulation was reported as 17,912 copies in 2012.

The newspaper features a weekly Jèrriais column accompanied by English-language précis.

The Bailiwick Express is Jersey's solitary online newspaper which concentrates on hard news delivered swiftly, and is supported by classified advertising, primarily of vehicles, employment vacancies, and property.

Magazines
Lifestyle magazines include Gallery Magazine (monthly) and The Jersey Life (monthly).

Les Nouvelles Chroniques du Don Balleine is a quarterly literary magazine in Jèrriais.

20/20 magazine is the island's only annual personal finance magazine; Global Assets the island's online quarterly international offshore finance magazine is also produced by the same company.

Connect magazine is a bi-monthly business title from the same stable as The Bailiwick Express.

References

 
Jersey
+Jersey